Ilnicki (feminine: Ilnicka; plural: Ilniccy) is a Polish surname. Notable people with this surname include:

 Ed Ilnicki (born 1995), Canadian football player
 Jake Ilnicki (born 1992), Canadian rugby player
 Maria Ilnicka (1825–1897), Polish writer and activist
 Maria Ilnicka-Mądry (born 1946), Polish politician

See also
 
 
 Ilnytskyi, a related Ukrainian surname

Polish-language surnames